Antoine Vitré (1595–1674) was a French printer of the 17th century. He was the King's printer for Oriental languages (Linguarum Orientalium Regis Typographus). 

Antoine Vitré printed several works with Arabic font types, using the fonts developed by François Savary de Brèves. From 1625, Antoine Vitré used these types to print the Paris Polyglot Bible printed by Antoine Vitré and edited by Guy Michel Lejay in 1645, which embraces the first printed texts of the Syriac Old Testament edited by Gabriel Sionita, the Book of Ruth by Abraham Ecchellensis, also a Maronite, the Samaritan Pentateuch and a version by Jean Morin (Morinus).

Printed works
Le Broiement des moulins des Rochellois, 1621
Dictionarium latino-arabicum, by Jean-Baptiste Du Val, 1622
Psautier in Syriac and Latin, 1625
Corpus juris avilis by Denys Godefroy, 1628
Bible polyglotte, 1645

Notes

French printers
1595 births
1674 deaths